The Curdridge Country Show is an annual country fair in Curdridge, Hampshire, England. The event is held mid-July on a Saturday, and attracts up to 7000 attendees each year. 2013 was to be the show's 57th year.

The show includes a dog show, falconry display, and a vintage car parade  There is a horticultural competition with numerous categories.  Vendor booths sell crafts and other items with demonstrations. 

The show also has side shows such as a coconut shy, plate smashing and tombolas. A barbecue, hog roast and bar provide refreshments.t. A traditional barn dance is held on the last Saturday.

References

External links
 

Events in Hampshire